Daybreak is a 1918 American silent drama film directed by Albert Capellani. The film is considered to be lost.

Plot
As described in a film magazine, Edith Frome (Stevens) finds it impossible to live with her husband Arthur (L'Estrange), who overindulges in liquor, and finally leaves him. After a separation of three years, she returns. Each evening she goes out and returns late, which arouses the suspicion of her husband. He has his secretary follow her and learns that she visits a child. Because of her friendliness with Dr. David Brett (Phillips), Arthur suspects the worst and institutes divorce proceedings. Edith tells him the truth concerning the child and Arthur, realizing his folly with his debauches, swears off liquor and they are reunited.

Cast 
 Emily Stevens as Edith Frome
 Julian L'Estrange as Arthur Frome
 Herman Lieb as Herbert Rankin
 Augustus Phillips as Dr. David Brett
 Francis Joyner as Carl Peterson (credited as Frank Joyner)
 Evelyn Brent as Det. Alma Peterson
 Joseph Daly as Otway (credited as Joe Daly)
 Evelyn Axzell as Meta Thompson (credited as Mrs. Evelyn Axzell)

Reception
Like many American films of the time, Daybreak was subject to cuts by city and state film censorship boards. For example, the Chicago Board of Censors cut two intertitles, "Now I know the truth — you have a child and Dr. Brett is the —" and "Yes and I know who's the father", and a shooting scene.

References

External links 

1918 films
1918 drama films
1918 lost films
Silent American drama films
American silent feature films
American black-and-white films
Films directed by Albert Capellani
Lost American films
Films based on works by Jane Cowl
Films based on works by Jane Murfin
Lost drama films
1910s American films
1910s English-language films